Dhanyawaddy Stadium is a multi-use stadium in Sittwe, Burma.  It is currently used mostly for football matches and is the home ground of Arakan United FC of the Myanmar Amateur League.  The stadium has a capacity of 7,000 spectators.

External links
 Stadium information 

Football venues in Myanmar